Gedung Aji is a district locat in the Tulang Bawang Regency of Lampung in Sumatra, Indonesia.

References 

Tulang Bawang Regency
Districts of Lampung